Tamil Nadu Agricultural University (TNAU) is the state agricultural university of Tamil Nadu located in Coimbatore, Tamil Nadu, India.

History
The Tamil Nadu Agricultural University had its genesis from establishment of an agricultural school at Chennai, Tamil Nadu, India, as early as 1868 which was later relocated at Coimbatore during 1906.

In 1920, it was affiliated to Madras University. TNAU assumed full responsibilities of Agricultural Education and Research and supported the State Agricultural Department by delivering research products. In 1958, it was recognized as a post-graduate center and began to offer masters and doctoral degrees.

Academics
The university offers 13 undergraduate programs, 40 graduate programs and 27 doctoral programs. As the university switched over to the e-learning from the academic year 2007, it was made compulsory for first-year students to procure personal laptops. Apart from academic institutes, the university now has research programs at more than 32 stations, spread over in Tamil Nadu with more than 1200 scientists and teaching faculty.

Rankings

Internationally, Tamil Nadu Agricultural University was ranked 301–350 in Asia by the QS World University Rankings of 2023. It was ranked 1501+ in the world by the Times Higher Education World University Rankings of 2023, 501+ in Asia in 2022 and the same among emerging economies.

Constituent colleges
The university has 15 constituent colleges:

Affiliate Colleges

Timeline
 1868: Agricultural School was started at Saidapet, Chennai (Madras).
 1906: The Saidapet Agricultural School was shifted to Coimbatore and foundation stone laid for Madras Agricultural College.
 1908: Students were admitted to education program leading to Licentiate in Agriculture (L. Ag.)
 1909: Opening of Agricultural College and Research Institute (AC & RI) by Sir Arthur Lawley.
 1920: The AC & RI was affiliated to Madras University. A new course of study leading to a three-year degree in Agriculture -B.Sc. (Ag.) was started.
 1945: Second Agricultural College was started at Bapatla (Now in Andhra Pradesh).
 1958: Regional Post-Graduate Centre was established to offer programs leading to master's degree in Agriculture & Horticulture. In Annamalai university, Agriculture teaching started leading to award of M.Sc.(Ag)in Horticulture first of its kind in India.
 1960: Integrated system with four year B.Sc. (Ag) degree program after pre-university education was introduced and subsequently doctoral programme in Agriculture was started.
 1965: Third Agricultural College was started at Madurai, Tamil Nadu and the Masters program at Madurai was introduced during 1969.
 1971: The Tamil Nadu Agricultural University came into existence with Coimbatore as its headquarters. The first vice chancellor Dr.G.Rengasamy was from ANNAMALAI UNIVERSITY which was having Faculty of Agriculture from 1958 onwards teaching agriculture and horticulture.
 1972: A separate Faculty of Horticulture was established and a degree program in Horticulture - B.Sc. (Hort.) was introduced. The College of Agricultural Engineering was established at Coimbatore and a bachelor's degree program in Agricultural Engineering - B.E.(Ag) was introduced.
 1973: Doctoral program was introduced in Horticultural College and Research Institute, Coimbatore.
 1975: Faculty of Post Graduate Education was established in TNAU, Coimbatore and master's and doctoral (1978) programs were started in Environmental Sciences and Biotechnology.
 1976: The Madras Veterinary College became constituent unit of TNAU and B.V.Sc. degree program was suitably restructured*.
 1977: Bachelor's degree (B.F.Sc.) program in Fisheries Science at Thoothukudi was started*.
 Masters and doctoral program in Agricultural Engineering was introduced.
 1980: Bachelor's degree (B.Sc. (H.Sc.)) in Home Science was launched in Madurai Campus.
 1981: Master's program was introduced in Home Science College & Research Institute, Madurai and doctoral program in 1988.
 1989: Doctoral program in Agriculture was introduced in Agricultural college & Research Institute, Madurai; Masters program introduced in Forest College & Research Institute, Mettupalayam and Horticultural College & Research Institute, Periyakulam.
 1990: Master's program in Agriculture was introduced in Agricultural College & Research Institute, Killikulam, Thoothukudi district, Tamil Nadu and Doctoral program in Forest College & Research Institute, Mettupalayam.
 1998: B.Tech. (Food Process Engineering) introduced as self-supporting program.
 2002: B.Tech. (Horticulture) and B.Tech. (Agriculture Biotechnology) introduced as self-supporting programs.
 2004: B.Tech. (Energy and Environmental Engineering) introduced as a self-supporting program.
 2005: Centennial celebrations of AC&RI, Coimbatore.
 2006: B.Tech. (Bioinformatics) introduced as a self-supporting program.
 2007: B.Tech. (Agricultural Information Technology) and B.S.(Agribusiness Management) introduced as a self-supporting programs. Nanotechnology introduced in undergraduate curriculum.
 2008: Dual Degree Masters Program with Cornell University, Ithaca, USA introduced. Dual degree option with Dalhousie University, Canada established for undergraduate program in B.Tech.(Environmental Landscape Horticulture)
 2011: B.Sc. (Sericulture) introduced. M.Tech. (Ag.) in Nanotechnology introduced and M.Tech. in Environmental Engineering introduced.
 2012: Masters program introduced in Plant Genetic Resource and Remote Sensing.
 2017: Ph.D. (Agri) in Nano Science and Technology introduced.

Notable alumni
 M. S. Swaminathan, Father of Green revolution in India
 C. Sylendra Babu IPS, DGP and Head of Police Force, Tamil Nadu Police
 K. Ramasamy
 M. S. Swaminathan
 C. Sylendra Babu
 Thenkachi Ko. Swaminathan
 K. C. Palanisamy
 M. Mahadevappa
 G. Dhinakar Raj

In popular culture
The college premises and campus in the movie Sillunu Oru Kaadhal is the agricultural university in Coimbatore

See also
 List of universities in India
 Universities and colleges in India
 Education in India
 Distance Education Council
 University Grants Commission (India)
 List of Tamil Nadu Government's Educational Institutions

References

External links

 Official website

Tamil Nadu Agricultural University
Universities and colleges in Coimbatore
Educational institutions established in 1971
1971 establishments in Tamil Nadu
Academic institutions formerly affiliated with the University of Madras